Maplewood Richmond Heights School District or MRHSD, is a public school district in Maplewood, Missouri. The district serves primarily students that live in Maplewood, Richmond Heights and certain sections of Webster Groves.

History
In 1840, the first school in the area opened off of Manchester Road and McCausland.  This school was called the "Washington Institute", and later the Benton Station School.  At the time it was a part of St. Louis Public Schools, however, in 1876, St. Louis City separated from St. Louis County causing a need for new school districts to serve communities in the county, including Maplewood and the surrounding cities. In 1907, the first high school opened, making it one of the few high schools in St. Louis County. In 1929, construction began on a new high school, which is still in use today. By 1935, MRHSD had a running bus system for its pupils. In 1951, the name was changed from School District of Maplewood to Maplewood-Richmond Heights School District. In 2002, First Lady Laura Bush visited MRH to host a "community and character" national program. In 2004, a new elementary school was opened. Due to ongoing gentrification within the borders of the MRHSD, student body enrollment has jumped nearly 40% from 1990 to 2019 causing an increased demand for new schools. An Early Childhood Center was opened in the early 2000s to accommodate Pre-K children. The school district is consistently one of the most improved school districts in Missouri.

Milestones 
 1840 - First school in the area opened
 1876 - St. Louis County separated from the city of St. Louis, resulting in the formation of a new school district in Maplewood 
 1888 - Bartold Valley School is constructed 
 1892 - the two-room Bartold Valley School is replaced with an eight-room school and renamed Valley School
 1906 - voters change the district from a rural school district to a village school district, Sutton School, and East Richmond School are built
 1909 - Lincoln School for Negroes opens with nine students in rented space in the Church of the Living God
 1910 - County courts officially designate the district as Maplewood City Schools
 1916 - Lincoln School for Negroes and a new high school building are constructed
 1921 - a second portion of the high school is approved for construction
 1922 - West Richmond School opens with portable classrooms
 1929 - construction begins on the current high school, designed by William B. Ittner, Black students attend Douglas School in Webster Groves, or Sumner or Vashon High School in St. Louis.
 1933 - "The New Lincoln School" is constructed and used in conjunction with what is now called "The Old Lincoln School". Grades 5-8 meet in the new building and 1-4 in the old school building. 
 1951 - the district expands and is re-named the Maplewood-Richmond Heights School District
 1953 - voters approve funds for a new Valley School and additions to East Richmond and the New Lincoln School.  The old Valley School and the Old Lincoln School are sold.
 1955 - the school board moves to integrate the high school over the next two years
 1963 - a new school is funded to replace Sutton.
 1964 - the Lincoln School is closed and sold to the Special School District
 1978 - facing financial difficulties, 21 teaching positions are eliminated, the district closes the Junior High School, and changes schools to be grade centers: 
 Early Childhood Center (K-2) operates at the Valley School location
 Nolan Bruce Elementary (3-5) operates at the site of the former Sutton School
 Cheney Elementary (2-5) operates at the former East Richmond School
 AB Green Middle School (6-8) operates at the former West Richmond School
 1986 - the number of students continues to decline and 47 teaching positions are eliminated
 2001 - a bond issue passes to construct a new elementary school at the site of the Cheney Elementary School, and to renovate a middle school center in the high school building.
 2002 - First Lady Laura Bush chooses MRH as the site to launch her "community and Character" program.  MRH opens its Student Success Center, an alternative high school, within the high school building.
 2020 - a bond issue is passed for an addition to the Middle School/High School building.

Academics
In 2018-19, the district wide average ACT score is 19.5 and 68% of students go to college. The annual performance score was 97.5 indicating it is well above the benchmark set by the state of Missouri to be a "fully accredited" school district".

Demographics

Finances
In the 2016–2017 school year, MRHSD had $19,483,000 worth of expenditures and $22,800,000 worth of revenue.

List of Schools
Maplewood Richmond Heights High School
MRH Middle School
MRH Elementary School
Early Education Center

References

School districts in Missouri
Education in St. Louis County, Missouri
School districts established in 1876
1876 establishments in Missouri